Andre Devell Spencer (July 20, 1964 – August 4, 2020) was an American professional basketball player. He was a 6' 6" (198 cm) 210 lb (95 kg) forward and played collegiately for Bakersfield College, a junior college, and the Northern Arizona Lumberjacks. He played for three teams in the National Basketball Association (NBA), and for six seasons in the Israeli Basketball Premier League.

Biography
He played basketball for Los Angeles-Manual Arts High. He then played basketball for the Bakersfield College Renegades from 1982 to 1984. He then attended Northern Arizona University where he earned all-Big Sky Conference honors for the Lumberjacks in 1986. In 1985 he was second in steals (47) and steals per game (1.6) in the Big Sky Conference, third in points (548) and points per game (18.9), and 8th in rebounds (174) and rebounds per game (8.0).

Spencer played for the Atlanta Hawks, Golden State Warriors, and Sacramento Kings during his NBA career from 1992 to 1994. Although he was also signed by the Miami Heat in October 1994, he was waived a few days later, before the 1994–95 season began.

He made it to the Israeli League finals in 1991 with Maccabi Rishon LeZion of the Israeli Basketball Premier League. The following year he averaged 21.4 points per game for the team, his career-high in his six seasons in Israel. He also played in Israel for Hapoel Tel Aviv, Ironi Ramat Gan, and Hapoel Afula. Spencer also played in France for JDA Dijon.

Spencer died August 4, 2020, aged 56.

References

External links

 ACB.com profile

1964 births
2020 deaths
African-American basketball players
American expatriate basketball people in France
American expatriate basketball people in Israel
American expatriate basketball people in Japan
American expatriate basketball people in Spain
American men's basketball players
Atlanta Hawks players
Bakersfield Renegades men's basketball players
Basketball players from Stockton, California
CB Estudiantes players
Cedar Rapids Silver Bullets players
Columbus Horizon players
Golden State Warriors players
Grand Rapids Hoops players
Hapoel Gilboa/Afula players
Hapoel Tel Aviv B.C. players
Ironi Ramat Gan players
Israeli Basketball Premier League players
JDA Dijon Basket players
La Crosse Bobcats players
Liga ACB players
Maccabi Rishon LeZion basketball players
Northern Arizona Lumberjacks men's basketball players
Oklahoma City Cavalry players
Rockford Lightning players
Sacramento Kings players
Small forwards
Topeka Sizzlers players
Undrafted National Basketball Association players
Wyoming Wildcatters players
American expatriate basketball people in the Philippines
Philippine Basketball Association imports
San Miguel Beermen players
Alviks BK players
20th-century African-American sportspeople
21st-century African-American people